The 1913 Copa Ibarguren was the 1st. edition of this National cup of Argentina, which trophy had been donated by Minister of Justice and Public Instruction, Dr. Carlos Ibarguren. It was played by the champions of both leagues, Primera División and Liga Rosarina de Football crowned during 1913.

Racing (Primera División champion) faced Newell's Old Boys (Liga Rosarina champion) at Estadio Racing Club in Avellaneda, on April 5, 1914. Racing won 3–1 with two goals by striker Alberto Marcovecchio.

Qualified teams

Match details

References

i
i
1913 in Argentine football
1913 in South American football
Football in Avellaneda